Roman theatres built during the Roman period may be found all over the Roman Empire. Some were older theatres that were re-worked.

See also

 Roman architecture
 Roman amphitheatre
 Theatre of ancient Rome

Notes

Bibliography
 
 

List
Theatres
Roman